During the 1991–92 English football season, Nottingham Forest F.C. competed in the Football League First Division.

Season summary
Nottingham Forest finished 8th for the second season running. They also reached the final of the League Cup, only to lose to that season's runners-up, Manchester United, and won the Full Members' Cup. A highlight of the season was a 4–0 win at neighbours Notts County, who were relegated at the end of the season.

Final league table

Results
Nottingham Forest's score comes first

Legend

Football League First Division

FA Cup

League Cup

Full Members' Cup

Squad

Transfers

In

Out

Transfers in:  £3,500,000
Transfers out:  £1,750,000
Total spending:  £1,750,000

References

Nottingham Forest F.C. seasons
Nottingham Forest